Edi Ponoš (born 10 April 1976) is a male javelin thrower from Croatia. His personal best throw was 77.95 metres, achieved in June 2004 in Ljubljana.

He won the bronze medal at the 2001 Mediterranean Games. He also competed at the 2004 Olympic Games, but without reaching the final. He became Croatian javelin throw champion in 2001, 2002, 2003, 2004 and 2006.

In June 2009 Ponoš was severely injured in a motorcycle accident and spent 10 days in a coma. By September 2009, Ponoš was already back to light training, having made a successful recovery.

Competition record

References

1976 births
Living people
Croatian male javelin throwers
Athletes (track and field) at the 2004 Summer Olympics
Olympic athletes of Croatia
Mediterranean Games bronze medalists for Croatia
Mediterranean Games medalists in athletics
Athletes (track and field) at the 2001 Mediterranean Games
20th-century Croatian people
21st-century Croatian people